A malignant acrospiroma is a sweat gland carcinoma of the hand, which may recur locally in 50% of patients after excision, with distant metastases occurring in 60% of patients.

See also 
 Acrospiroma
 Syringoma
 Hidrocystoma
 List of cutaneous conditions

References

External links 

 

Epidermal nevi, neoplasms, and cysts
Rare cancers